Waterwolf, or Water-wolf is a Dutch word that comes from the Netherlands, which refers to the tendency of lakes in low lying peaty land, sometimes previously worn-down by men digging peat for fuel, to enlarge or expand by flooding, thus eroding the lake shores, and potentially causing harm to infrastructure, or death. The term waterwolf is an example of zoomorphism, in which a non-living thing is given traits or characteristics of an animal (whereas a non-living thing given human traits or characteristics is personification). The traits of a wolf most commonly given to lakes include “something to be feared”, “quick and relentless”,” an enemy of man”.

The Netherlands, meaning “low countries”, is a nation where 18% of the land is below sea level, and half of the land under one meter above sea level, and is prone to flooding. Before modern flood control, severe storms could cause flooding that could wipe out whole villages in the area of the waterwolf. Much of the land in the Netherlands consists of peat bogs. Peat is known to be an organic matter substance consisting of 10% carbon and 90% water and is usually found in colder climates where the plant growth and plant decay are slow. Peat is considered a carbon sequestration, and when dried can be burned as a fuel. Historically peat was the primary source of fuel in the Netherlands, and farmers would mine the peat to burn or sell, thus contributing to the erosion of the landscape.

The first great step to reclaiming land taken by the waterwolf was made with the creation of windmills that could pump water out of the surrounding area, allowing for the creation of polders, or areas inhabited below sea level with an artificially managed water table. Modern flood control in the Netherlands consists of maintaining polders, levees, and is highlighted by the world's largest dam project: The Delta Works. While modern flood control has conquered the waterwolf, new events such as rising sea levels from climate change could once again bring the waterwolf.

References

 For reference, see the Dutch version: :nl:Waterwolf (animalisering). ("animalisering" = "personification as an animal".)
 De Waterwolf getemd. Over geschiedenis en volksleven van Haarlemmermeer, edited by TJ. W.R. de Haan, with contributions by W. Jappe Alberts, Tj. W. R. de Haan, Historical Committee Haarlemmermeer, Polder Board of the Haarlemmermeer, and the Haarlemmermer town archives, Kruseman's Uitgeversmaatschappij, The Hague, 1970, OCLC ocm37651338

Lakes of the Netherlands
Lakes
Coastal engineering